The Freedom Party of New York may refer to:

 Freedom Party of New York (1994)
 Freedom Party of New York (2010)